Suaia Matagi (born 23 March 1988), also known by the nickname of "Sui", is a professional rugby league footballer who plays as a  for the Castleford Tigers in the Betfred Super League. He is both a New Zealand and Samoan international. 

He previously played for the New Zealand Warriors, Sydney Roosters, Penrith Panthers and the Parramatta Eels in the NRL, and the Huddersfield Giants in the Super League.

Early life
Matagi was born in Auckland, New Zealand to Samoan parents, the second youngest of six brothers. He attended Kelston Boys' High School before dropping out at age 14, having become involved in gang violence, and heavy alcohol abuse. 

In 2006, at the age of 17, Matagi was sentenced to three years in prison for assaulting two boys during a drunken rage that occurred when he was 15. He served his sentence at Mount Eden Prison, and later Manawatu Prison; his participation in rehabilitation courses saw him granted parole after one year.

Playing career
Following his release from prison, Matagi took up rugby league in 2008, having never previously played any organised sport. He played for the Te Atatu Roosters, and later the Mount Albert Lions in the Auckland Rugby League competition. Matagi was selected to play for the Auckland representative team, and the New Zealand Residents for four consecutive years between 2009 and 2012. He was named man of the match in Auckland's 44-34 victory over the South Island Scorpions in the National Competition's 2011 Grand Final.

New Zealand Warriors
Matagi made his debut for the Auckland Vulcans, the New Zealand Warriors' feeder team, in the New South Wales Cup on 3 April 2010. He played regularly for the Vulcans in 2012, and was named 2012 New Zealand domestic player of the year. Matagi trialed with the Warriors during the 2013 pre-season, impressing coach Matthew Elliott enough to earn an NRL contract.

Matagi made his NRL debut for the Warriors on 11 May 2013 against the Canterbury-Bankstown Bulldogs at Westpac Stadium. On 11 June 2013, he re-signed with the Warriors until the end of 2014. Matagi played 11 games for the Warriors in 2013, scoring a try in their match against the Penrith Panthers in round 23. On 22 September 2013, Matagi was named at prop in the 2013 New South Wales Cup Team of the Year.

Matagi was a member of the Warriors' squad that played in the 2014 and 2015 Auckland Nines pre-season tournaments. On 2 March 2014, Matagi re-signed with the Warriors until the end of 2016. He played in all 24 of the Warriors' regular season games in 2014, but played in only 1 game during the first half of 2015 before being dropped to the Warriors' New South Wales Cup team. 

In May 2015, Matagi requested, and was granted, a release from his contract with the Warriors in order to sign with the Sydney Roosters effective immediately.

Stuff.co.nz, and The Sydney Morning Herald described Matagi as having built a cult following during his time at the Warriors.

Sydney Roosters
Upon moving to the Roosters, Matagi played for their feeder club, the Wyong Roos, in the New South Wales Cup. An injury to Jared Waerea-Hargreaves saw Matagi play 7 games for the Roosters in the back-end of 2015.

Penrith Panthers
On 4 November 2015, Matagi signed a one-year contract with the Penrith Panthers, with an option for a second year. He was a late addition to the Panthers' 2016 Auckland Nines squad following an injury to Reagan Campbell-Gillard. Matagi was a regular for the Panthers' in 2016, playing a total of 23 games.

Parramatta Eels
In November 2016, Matagi signed a two-year contract with the Parramatta Eels.  Matagi was part of the Parramatta side which finished fourth on the table and made the finals for the first time since 2009.  In 2018, Matagi started the first two games of the season from the interchange bench.  Following Parramatta's humiliating 54-0 Round 2 up defeat by Manly, Matagi was left out of the Parramatta side by coach Brad Arthur but was recalled 5 weeks later in Round 7 where Parramatta defeated Manly 44-10.  Matagi played a total of nine games for Parramatta in the 2018 NRL season as the club endured a horrid campaign finishing last on the table.

In June 2018, Matagi was selected to play for NSW residents against the QLD residents side.

Huddersfield Giants
On 1 July 2018, Matagi signed a two-year deal to join English side Huddersfield beginning in 2019. Matagi said of the move "I am extremely excited to take my football to the next level under the leadership of coach Simon Woolford and I'm also looking forward to the challenge of playing in the English Super League, joining a proud club like the Huddersfield Giants is a privilege and I will represent our fans to the best of my ability".

Castleford Tigers (loan) 
On 25 November 2020, it was reported that he had signed a season-long loan for Castleford (Heritage № 1007) in the Super League from Huddersfield.

Castleford Tigers 
On 10 October 2021, it was announced that Matagi had signed a deal to remain at Castleford on a permanent basis, joining the Tigers on a two-year contract. He scored his first try for the club on 14 April 2022 against Wakefield Trinity.

Representative career
Matagi made his international debut for Samoa at the 2013 World Cup, playing in all four of their matches, scoring tries against New Zealand and Papua New Guinea. In May 2014, Matagi played for Samoa in the 2014 Pacific Rugby League test against Fiji to qualify for the 2014 Four Nations.

In October 2014, Matagi was named in both the New Zealand and Samoan Four Nations squads. He opted to represent New Zealand, playing in one of their four matches, against Samoa.

Matagi was named in New Zealand's train-on squad for the 2016 Four Nations, but was not included in the final team.

On 25 June 2021 he played for the Combined Nations All Stars in their 26-24 victory over England, staged at the Halliwell Jones Stadium, Warrington, as part of England’s 2021 Rugby League World Cup preparation.

Personal life
Matagi is a Christian. He is a father of four children with his partner Fai.

References

External links
Castleford Tigers profile
Huddersfield Giants profile
Parramatta Eels profile
Penrith Panthers profile
NRL profile
2017 RLWC profile
SL profile

 

1988 births
Living people
Auckland rugby league team players
Castleford Tigers players
Combined Nationalities rugby league team players
Halifax R.L.F.C. players
Huddersfield Giants players
Mount Albert Lions players
New Zealand national rugby league team players
New Zealand rugby league players
New Zealand sportspeople of Samoan descent
New Zealand prisoners and detainees
New Zealand Warriors players
Parramatta Eels players
Penrith Panthers players
People educated at Kelston Boys' High School
Rugby league players from Auckland
Rugby league props
Samoa national rugby league team players
Samoan sportspeople
Samoan rugby league players
Sydney Roosters players
Te Atatu Roosters players
Wyong Roos players